Jean de Montpezat de Carbon (1605–1685) was a French bishop.

Biography

Jean de Montpezat de Carbon was born in Saint-Martory in 1605.  He was selected as Bishop of Saint-Papoul on June 14, 1657.  Pope Alexander VII confirmed his appointment on June 3, 1658 and he was consecrated as a bishop by Pierre de Marca, Archbishop of Toulouse, on September 8, 1658.  He was next selected as Archbishop of Bourges on December 18, 1664, with Pope Alexander VII confirming the appointment on April 22, 1665.  Finally, he was selected as Archbishop of Sens on October 14, 1674, with Pope Clement X confirming the appointment on May 6, 1675.  He died on November 5, 1685.

References
Profile at catholic-hierarchy.org

1605 births
1685 deaths
Archbishops of Sens
Archbishops of Bourges
Bishops of Saint-Papoul
17th-century Roman Catholic archbishops in France